The Bhambi Khalpa are a Hindu caste found in the state of Gujarat in India. They are a sub-group within the Bhambi community. The Khalpa have scheduled caste status.

Origin 

The name Khalpa has been derived from the word khal, which is the Gujarati word which means the carcass of a dead animal. They are said to be a sub-division of the Chamar community. The Khalpa are a Gujarati speaking community.

Present circumstances 

The Khalpa are an endogamous community, and practice clan exogamy. Historically, they used to intermarry with the Bhambi Rohit, but this has been discontinued. Their main clans are the Chauhan, Parmar, Katariya, Goel, Solanki and Kothari. Historically, the Khalpa were leather tanners and shoemakers, but like other artisan communities are abandoning their traditional occupation. Many are now employed as wage labourers. A small number are now small and medium-sized peasant cultivators.

See also 
Bhambi Sindhi Mochi
Bhambi Rohit

References

Indian castes
Dalit communities
Scheduled Castes of Gujarat
Scheduled Castes of Rajasthan
Scheduled Castes of Madhya Pradesh